Ambassadors of Music is a 1952 West German musical documentary film directed by Hermann Stöß.

Made in 1951, it charts the revival of the Berlin Philharmonic Orchestra in post-war Germany under the leadership of Sergiu Celibidache. During the war the orchestra's concert hall had been bombed-out. The film portrays the Orchestra as part of a revived German culture, that had survived the Nazi years and was now presenting a positive image of the new West Germany to other peoples of Europe.

Cast
 Hilde Körber
 Werner Finck
 Josef Pelz von Felinau
 Wolfgang Behrendt
 Albert Ebbecke
 Karla Höcker
 Margo Ufer
 Sergiu Celibidache as himself
 Wilhelm Furtwängler as himself
 Richard Strauss as himself, Archive footage
 Bruno Walter as himself

References

Bibliography 
 Lydia Goehr. Elective Affinities: Musical Essays on the History of Aesthetic Theory. Columbia University Press, 2011.

External links 
 

1952 films
1952 documentary films
1952 musical films
German documentary films
German musical films
West German films
1950s German-language films
Films shot in Berlin
German black-and-white films
1950s German films